Balwearie is a historic plantation house located near Winnsboro, Fairfield County, South Carolina.  It is a -story, brick and frame residence with a gabled roof and cross-gabled front porch. The first story is of brick construction; half-story is sheathed in weatherboard.  The front gable is supported by six paneled wooden posts. The house was constructed about 1822, but altered following an 1886 storm.  A rear porch was converted into a kitchen in 1975.

It was added to the National Register of Historic Places in 1984.

References

Plantation houses in South Carolina
Houses on the National Register of Historic Places in South Carolina
Houses completed in 1886
Houses in Fairfield County, South Carolina
National Register of Historic Places in Fairfield County, South Carolina